Wool Market is the name of:

 Doncaster Wool Market, a market hall in England
 Wool Market, Mississippi, a community in the United States
 Wool Market square in Bydgoszcz, a square in Poland